Cavendish Icefalls is an icefall in the Taylor Glacier between Solitary Rocks and Cavendish Rocks, in Victoria Land. It was named by C.S. Wright, of the British Antarctic Expedition, 1910–13, after the Cavendish Laboratory of Cambridge, England, where Wright did much of his research work.

References
 

Icefalls of Antarctica
Landforms of Victoria Land
McMurdo Dry Valleys